Arnd Schmitt (born 13 July 1965 in Heidenheim an der Brenz) is a German fencer and Olympic champion in the épée competition.

He won a gold medal in the individual épée and a team silver medal at the 1988 Summer Olympics in Seoul. He received an Olympic gold medal in épée team in 1992. Schmitt was inducted into Germany's Sports Hall of Fame in 2016.

References

External links

1965 births
Living people
German male fencers
Olympic fencers of Germany
Olympic fencers of West Germany
Fencers at the 1988 Summer Olympics
Fencers at the 1992 Summer Olympics
Fencers at the 1996 Summer Olympics
Fencers at the 2000 Summer Olympics
Olympic gold medalists for West Germany
Olympic silver medalists for West Germany
Olympic gold medalists for Germany
Olympic medalists in fencing
Medalists at the 1988 Summer Olympics
Medalists at the 1992 Summer Olympics
Universiade medalists in fencing
Universiade bronze medalists for Germany